Duane Lonell Starks (born May 23, 1974) is a former American football cornerback. He was drafted by the Baltimore Ravens 10th overall in the 1998 NFL Draft. He played college football at the University of Miami.

Starks, who earned a Super Bowl ring with the Ravens in Super Bowl XXXV, also played for the Arizona Cardinals, New England Patriots and Oakland Raiders.

Early years
Duane Starks attended Miami Beach High School in Miami Beach, Florida, and won varsity letters in both football and track and field. In football, as a senior quarterback, he was a first-team All-Dade County selection, where he was a teammate of future pro bowl corner Samari Rolle, and a second-team All-Florida selection. In track, he finished second at the State Finals on the long jump and set the school record in the long jump.

College career
Starks was a two-year starter at cornerback, and a star returner for the University of Miami. Starks was interviewed about his time at the University of Miami for the documentary The U, which premiered December 12, 2009 on ESPN.

Professional career

Baltimore Ravens
Duane Starks was picked with the 10th overall pick in the 1998 NFL Draft. Right away he was an important player in the Ravens famous defense. He recorded 20 interceptions in his first four years as a Raven. He is most well known by Raven fans for his interception for a touchdown in Super Bowl XXXV, a play that many agree ended the New York Giants small chance for a comeback.

Arizona Cardinals
Starks was signed as a free agent at the end of the 2001 season by the Arizona Cardinals. He became an impact in the secondary by intercepting two passes his first year. His second year was ended early with a season-ending injury. He bounced back after that by intercepting three passes and returning one for a touchdown. He recorded a total of 5 interceptions and one touchdown with the team.

New England Patriots
After the 2004 season the New England Patriots traded a third round pick to bring the veteran to bolster their secondary after losing their Pro Bowl corner Ty Law in the off season. He was having a lackluster season when the Pats placed him on IR after a season-ending shoulder injury.

Oakland Raiders
The Oakland Raiders signed Starks after the Patriots released him following the 2005 season. He played in only three games during the 2006 season, recording three tackles. He was inactive for the first three games of the Raiders' 2007 season, and released to make room for quarterback and first-round pick JaMarcus Russell. He was out of football the rest of the 2007 season.

On April 15, 2008, Starks was re-signed by the Raiders on a one-year contract, but was released by the Raiders on May 13.

NFL statistics

Regular season

Postseason

References

External links
New England Patriots bio
Oakland Raiders bio

1974 births
Living people
Players of American football from Miami
American football cornerbacks
Holmes Bulldogs football players
Miami Hurricanes football players
Baltimore Ravens players
Arizona Cardinals players
New England Patriots players
Oakland Raiders players
Miami Beach Senior High School alumni